The State of East Java was a federal state (negara bagian) formed on the Indonesian island of Java by the Netherlands in 1948. It subsequently became a component of the United States of Indonesia, but merged into the Republic of Indonesia on 9 March 1950.

Person of interests
 Achmad Kusumonegoro, Wali negara
 Tan Boen Aan
 Sutedjo
 Djuwito
 J.F. Tumbelaka
 Sujadi

See also

History of Indonesia
Indonesian National Revolution
Indonesian regions

References

 
 

Indonesian National Revolution